William and Ann was launched in 1781 at Whitby. From her launch until 1805 she alternated between being a transport and trading with the Baltic. In 1805 she became a whaler in the northern whale fishery . She wrecked in ice in 1830 in the Greenland fisheries on her 24th whaling voyage.

Career
William and Ann first appeared in Lloyd's Register (LR) in 1781. When she was launched Great Britain was still at war and her initial service was as a transport. After the war ended in 1783, William and Ann started trading with the Baltic. Thereafter, she interspersed trading with the Baltic and service as a transport.

LR carried William and Ann until 1810 with data unchanged from the 1805 volume. However, William and Ann had become a whaler, something that the Register of Shipping (RS) had recorded.

Some data exists on William and Anns catches in the Northern Whale Fishery.

In 1809 William and Ann traded between London and Whitby rather than engaging in whaling.

Fate
The 1830 season was a disastrous one for the Northern Whale Fishery. Seven Scottish and five English ships were lost between 10 June and 10 September when beset by ice. William and Ann, of Whitby, Terry, master, was one of the vessels lost.

Citations and references
Citations

References
 
 

1781 ships
Ships built in Whitby
Age of Sail merchant ships of England
Whaling ships
Maritime incidents in 1830